Oscar Peterson Plays the Cole Porter Songbook is a 1959 album by Oscar Peterson, of compositions by Cole Porter.

Track listing
 "In the Still of the Night" – 2:49
 "It's All Right With Me" – 2:51
 "Love for Sale" – 3:26
 "Just One of Those Things" – 2:21
 "I've Got You Under My Skin" – 2:47
 "Ev'ry Time We Say Goodbye" – 2:17
 "Night and Day" – 2:30
 "You'd Be So Easy to Love" – 2:34
 "Why Can't You Behave?" – 2:58
 "I Love Paris" – 2:09
 "I Concentrate on You" – 3:08
 "It's De-Lovely" – 2:28

All music written by Cole Porter.

Personnel

Performance
Ray Brown - double bass
Oscar Peterson - piano
Ed Thigpen - drums

References

1959 albums
Oscar Peterson albums
Albums produced by Norman Granz
Verve Records albums
Cole Porter tribute albums